Idrisyn Oliver Evans (1894–1977) was an Orange Free State-born editor and writer. He lived in the UK from an early age, and was a UK civil servant from 1912.  He retired in 1956, but continued working as an editor.

Evans was noted as a translator of the works of Jules Verne. He also wrote about inventions, and penned historical novels featuring inventions.  In 1966, Evans edited a work called Science Fiction through the Ages.

Works

Fiction
 Gadget City: A Story of Ancient Alexandria (1944) 
 The Heavens Declare: A Story of Galileo Scientist-Astronomer (1949) 
 Strange Devices: A Story of the Siege of Syracuse (1950) 
 The Coming of a King; A Story of the Stone Age (1950)

Non-fiction
 The World of Tomorrow – A Junior Book of Forecasts (1933) 
 Inventors of the World (1962) 
 Jules Verne and his Work (1965)

Works as editor
 Anthology of Armageddon (1935) 
 Jules Verne – Master of Science Fiction (1956) 
 Science Fiction through the Ages  (1966) – two volumes

References

External links
The Encyclopedia of Science Fiction, on-line.  Entry for I. O. Evans
I O Evans as a Fortean

1894 births
1977 deaths
Orange Free State emigrants to the United Kingdom
Translators from French
20th-century British translators